PZO may refer to:

 PZO, IATA airport code for Manuel Carlos Piar Guayana Airport
 PZO, nickname of Armen Kazarian, a Russian mobster involved in the 2010 Medicaid fraud
 Podnik zahraničního obchodu, a type of company in Communist Czechoslovakia